Bushnak (meaning "Bosnian" or "Bosniak", also transliterated Bushnaq, Boshnak, Bouchenak and Bouchnak) is a surname common among Levantines of Bosniak origin. Those sharing this surname are the descendants of Bosniaks apprehensive of living under Christian rule after the Austro-Hungarian occupation of Bosnia and Herzegovina in 1878, who immigrated to Ottoman Syria.

While not originally from one family, most Bosniaks who immigrated to the Levant adopted Bushnak as a common surname, attesting to their origins. Bushnak is also used colloquially among Palestinians to refer to someone who is fair-skinned and good-looking.

History
Some Bosnian movement to Palestine occurred when Bosniak soldiers were brought to Palestine in the late 1800s to provide reinforcements for the Ottoman army.

More substantial movement occurred after 1878, when the Austro-Hungarian empire, ruled by the House of Habsburg, occupied Bosnia. Bosniak emigration continued through this period, escalating after the Austro-Hungarian's 1908 annexation of Bosnia.  Many immigrated to parts of what is now modern Turkey, while a smaller number settled in Ottoman Syria (modern Syria, Israel, Palestine, Lebanon and Jordan).

Bosnian immigrants settled predominantly in villages in the parts of the present day West Bank and Israel: Caesarea, Yanun, Nablus and Tulkarem. Their descendants still live in these villages, their Bosnian heritage reflected in the Arab surname of Bushnak.

Notable people bearing the surname

Bushnak
Ramez Bushnak (1976-2000), an Israeli Arab civilian shot dead by Israeli police during the Second Intifada

Bushnaq
Ali Bushnaq, Palestinian Mount Everest climber
Alia Bushnaq (born 2000), Jordanian athlete
Suzan Bushnaq (born 1963), Kuwaiti painter, daughter of Mohammed Bushnaq 
Suad Bushnaq (born 1982), Jordanian-Canadian film composer
Mohammed Bushnaq (1934-2017), Palestinian artist (painter and sculptor)

Bouchnak
Lotfi Bouchnak (born 1952), Tunisian singer
Hamid Bouchnak (born 1969), Moroccan raï singer

Boushnak
Laura Boushnak (born 1976), Kuwaiti-born Palestinian photographer

See also
Bosniaks in Syria
Armas
Magyarab
Urums

Notes and references

Bibliography

 
Bosnian surnames
Bosniak diaspora
European diaspora in the Arab world
European diaspora in Israel
European diaspora in Lebanon
European diaspora in the State of Palestine
European diaspora in Syria
Sunni Islam